Marek Ujlaky (born 3 December 2003) is a Slovak professional footballer who plays for Spartak Trnava as a centre back.

Club career

Spartak Trnava
Ujlaky signed his first professional contract with Spartak Trnava in May 2021.

He made his Fortuna Liga debut for Spartak in a home fixture at Štadión Antona Malatinského on 10 April 2021 against ViOn Zlaté Moravce. He came on in the 88th minute to replace team captain Ján Vlasko with the score set at 2-0 following a first-half goal by Vlasko and a second-half own goal by Matej Moško. Ujlaky was immediately given the captain's armband. While on pitch, Saymon Cabral set the final score at 3-0 for Spartak.

In June 2022, Ujlaky signed his first professional contract with Spartak along with Patrick Karhan, whose father Miroslav played and managed Spartak, and collected over 100 caps for Slovakia. Both players were to succeed their fathers in their careers and serve as a motivation for other Academy players of Spartak Trnava, according to club President Peter Macho.

Personal life
Ujlaky is the son of Marek Ujlaky, a former Slovak international who played almost 400 league fixtures for Spartak Trnava.

Honours
Spartak Trnava
Slovak Cup: 2021–22

References

External links
 Futbalnet profile 
 

2003 births
Living people
Sportspeople from Trnava
Slovak footballers
Association football defenders
Slovakia youth international footballers
Slovak Super Liga players
FC Spartak Trnava players